In the mathematical discipline of category theory, the Freyd cover or scone category is a construction that yields a set-like construction out of a given category.  The only requirement is that the original category has a terminal object.  The scone category inherits almost any categorical construct the original category has.  Scones can be used to generally describe proofs that use logical relations.

Definition
Formally, the scone of a category C with a terminal object 1 is the comma category .

References

Category theory